Pehur High Level Canal commonly known as STFA Canal located in  Swabi District, Khyber Pakhtunkhwa, Pakistan.

References

Canals in Pakistan
Swabi District
Irrigation canals